The 1961–62 WHL season was the tenth season of the Western Hockey League. The Edmonton Flyers were the President's Cup champions as they beat the Spokane Comets in seven games in the final series.

Final Standings 

bold - qualified for playoffs

Playoffs 
The Edmonton Flyers win the President's Cup 4 games to 3.

References 

Western Hockey League (1952–1974) seasons
1961–62 in American ice hockey by league
1961–62 in Canadian ice hockey by league